Marianki may refer to the following places:
Marianki, Lipno County in Kuyavian-Pomeranian Voivodeship (north-central Poland)
Marianki, Rypin County in Kuyavian-Pomeranian Voivodeship (north-central Poland)
Marianki, Świecie County in Kuyavian-Pomeranian Voivodeship (north-central Poland)
Marianki, Łódź Voivodeship (central Poland)
Marianki, Białobrzegi County in Masovian Voivodeship (east-central Poland)
Marianki, Lipsko County in Masovian Voivodeship (east-central Poland)
Marianki, Lubusz Voivodeship (west Poland)
Marianki, Nowa Sól County in Lubusz Voivodeship